This is a chronological partial list of films which include a musical Overture at the beginning, against a blank screen or still pictures. Not included are films where an overture is used to present the credits, or underscored scenes that are already part of the plot. Often, but not necessarily, these films also include an intermission with entr'acte, followed by exit music (after the credits).

This list documents the rise and fall of the Overture/Roadshow practice over film history.

Overtures were popular in 1950s and 1960s Hollywood musicals (particularly those of Rodgers and Hammerstein) but have become less common since. In many cases, these overtures have been cut from TV and video releases and can only be found on "restored" DVD, Blu-ray and Ultra HD Blu-ray versions, if at all.

The "Golden Age" era

Don Juan (1926)
The Jazz Singer (1927)
Noah's Ark (1928)
Warming Up (1928)
The Desert Song (1929)
Gold Diggers of Broadway (1929)
The Hollywood Revue of 1929 (1929) 
Paris (1929)
Sally (1929)
Show Boat (1929) 
The Show of Shows (1929)
Hell's Angels (1930) 
Mammy (1930)
No, No Nanette (1930)
Viennese Nights (1930)
One Hour With You (1932)
King Kong (1933)
A Midsummer Night's Dream (1935)
The Great Ziegfeld (1936)
Marie Antoinette (1938)

Gone with the Wind (1939)
Citizen Kane (1941)
Best Foot Forward (1943)
This Is the Army (1943)
The Song of Bernadette (1943) (included on the soundtrack CD, reinstated on the Blu-Ray release)
Since You Went Away (1944)
Spellbound (1945)
Duel in the Sun (1946)
Samson and Delilah (1949) 

Note: The "lost overture" to King Kong (1933), which first premiered on the channel Turner Classic Movies in 2005 and was released on DVD that same year, is in fact a montage of music recordings from the film spliced together for that specific release. There was no overture in the original release.

1950–70

Quo Vadis (1951)
This Is Cinerama (1952)
How to Marry a Millionaire (1953) 
Julius Caesar (1953) (not used at the last minute)
Three Coins in the Fountain (1954)
East of Eden (1955)
Oklahoma! (1955)
Cinerama Holiday (1955)
High Society (1956)
The King and I (1956) (original "roadshow" premiere, 1961 reissue and 1999 DVD only)
The Ten Commandments (1956)
Around the World in Eighty Days (1956)
Helen of Troy (1956)
Island in the Sun (1957)
Raintree County (1957)
South Pacific (1958)
Windjammer (1958)
Ben-Hur (1959)
The Diary of Anne Frank (1959)
North by Northwest (1959)
The Alamo (1960)
Spartacus (1960)
El Cid  (1961)
Judgment at Nuremberg (1961)
King of Kings (1961)
West Side Story  (1961) (accompanied by abstract artwork on screen that resolves into the title card and then the opening shot)
How The West Was Won (1962)
Lawrence of Arabia (1962)
Mutiny on the Bounty (1962) 
The Longest Day (1962)
The Wonderful World of the Brothers Grimm (1962)
55 Days at Peking (1963)
Cleopatra (1963)
It's a Mad, Mad, Mad, Mad World (1963)
Cheyenne Autumn (1964)
My Fair Lady (1964) (onscreen, over flower montage that becomes main title)
The Unsinkable Molly Brown (1964)
The Fall of the Roman Empire (1964)
Battle of the Bulge (1965) 
Doctor Zhivago (1965) 
The Agony and the Ecstasy (1965)
The Great Race (1965) (with chorus)
The Greatest Story Ever Told (1965)
The Sound of Music (1965)
Grand Prix (1966) 
Hawaii (1966)
Is Paris Burning? (1966)
Khartoum (1966)
The Sand Pebbles (1966)
Camelot (1967)
Doctor Dolittle (1967)
Far From the Madding Crowd (1967)
The Happiest Millionaire (1967) (mostly 70mm prints and letterbox DVDs)
Thoroughly Modern Millie (1967)
Ulysses (1967)
2001: A Space Odyssey (1968) 
Chitty Chitty Bang Bang (1968) (not an orchestral overture, but a sound montage of an auto race around the theater)
Finian’s Rainbow (1968)
Funny Girl (1968)
Ice Station Zebra (1968)
The Lion in Winter (1968)
Oliver! (1968)
The Shoes of the Fisherman (1968) 
Star!  (1968) (onscreen, master shot of theatre stage)
Goodbye, Mr. Chips (1969)
Sweet Charity (1969) (overture bridges seamlessly as picture fades into main titles)
Darling Lili (1970) (overture cut before theatrical release, added only to severely cut recent video version)
Ryan's Daughter (1970)
Scrooge (1970) (mostly 70mm prints and letterbox DVDs)

After 1970

Wild Rovers (1971) (the director's cut is a roadshow presentation)
Mary, Queen of Scots (1971)
The Cowboys  (1972)
1776 (1972) (laserdisc version only)
Man of La Mancha  (1972) (included as an extra after the film on the DVD, but heard in its proper place on the VHS release and in the theatrical release)
Jeremiah Johnson  (1972)
Young Winston (1972)
Tom Sawyer  (1973) (mostly 70mm prints and letterbox VHS tapes. Reinstated on the Blu-Ray)
That's Entertainment! (1974)
Huckleberry Finn (1974) (mostly 70mm prints and letterbox VHS tapes. Reinstated on the Blu-Ray)
That's Entertainment, Part II (1976)
Star Trek: The Motion Picture  (1979) (listed as "Ilia's Theme" on the soundtrack album)
The Black Hole (1979) (mostly 70mm film prints and letterbox DVDs) 
Greystoke: The Legend of Tarzan, Lord of the Apes (1984) (a new overture for the 1992 extended version)
The Nightmare Before Christmas (1993) (roadshow presentations only)
That's Entertainment! III (1994)
Dancer in the Dark (2000) (overture played with closed curtains in European theaters, released instead with an accompanying collage of paintings for (curtain-less) US cinemas)
Kingdom of Heaven (2005) (the director's cut is a roadshow presentation)
Tron: Legacy (2010) (theatrical premiere only; the short overture is included in the soundtrack album)
Melancholia (2011)
The Hateful Eight (2015) (roadshow presentations only)
Beauty and the Beast (2017) (theatrical premiere and Blu-Ray release only)

References

Overtures